The Express was a free daily newspaper, distributed in the Washington metropolitan area. It was a publication of The Washington Post. , it had the second highest circulation in the District of Columbia after The Washington Post, and was read by 239,500 people every day. The final issue was published on September 12, 2019, after losing money and readers.

History and operations
The Express has been published every weekday in a tabloid format since it started publication on August 4, 2003. It is distributed by hawkers at Washington Metro stations and in newspaper racks at other locations throughout the Washington metropolitan area. It was owned and printed by the Washington Post Company, owner of The Washington Post, which is itself owned by Jeff Bezos through a holding company called Nash Holdings LLC. , it had a daily print circulation of 180,000. The Express is published by Express Publications Company, LLC, a wholly owned subsidiary of the Washington Post Company.

Express was written and edited from the Washington Post's office on Franklin Square in Washington, D.C. Prior to 2010, it was produced from an office in Arlington, Virginia. Printing the newspaper required over 700 tons of newsprint annually.

Express was written and edited by a staff of 23, up from 13 in 2003.

The Post announced that its final edition of Express would be dated September 12, 2019.

Content
Although it had the same owner as The Washington Post, few of the hard-news stories were written by Post staff. Express relied on syndicated content and wire services—particularly the Associated Press and Getty images—for most of its content. In general, Express' content tended to be lighter than the Post's—it included sections like "People" (celebrity gossip), "Trending" (social media and Internet culture), and "page three" and "eyeopeners" (highlighting uplifting or humorous stories)—and tended to emphasize local and sports news more than the Post. The cover story of Express was often a sports story, for instance.

Express always included a special section, which was different each weekday. These sections were:

 Screens (Monday), a TV and movies section.
 Fit (Tuesday), a health and fitness section, which also includes an advice column, "Baggage Check," written by licensed clinical psychologist Dr. Andrea Bonior. 
 Federal Workforce (Wednesday), a page with articles about issues relevant to civilian federal government employees. Also typically includes a promotion for the Post's Can he do that? podcast, which covers the Trump presidency.
 Weekend Pass (Thursday), an extended entertainment section with a detailed guide to the weekend's upcoming shows, concerts, museum exhibits, and the like. It was by far the largest of the special sections.
 Movies (Friday), a section with reviews of new movies and trailers and some Hollywood news.
 Apartment Showcase (Friday), a listing of featured apartments in the Washington metro area. Apartment Showcase is also published as a weekly independent publication. Like Express, it is owned by the Washington Post.

Express also ran some special advertising sections—such as the Guide to the Lively Arts and the Religious Services Directory—as well as the following special monthly sections:
 Ahead (Second Monday of each month), on career planning and postgraduate and continuing education.
 Condo Living (Fourth Wednesday of each month), like Apartment Showcase, but specializing in condos.
 Free + Easy (First Thursday of each month), a feature on free events and activities in the Washington area.

Express' original stories were available on the washingtonpost.com website. The newspaper was financed solely by advertising.

The newspaper did not have an opinion section or letters to the editor, unlike other newspapers in the local market such as Politico, The Washington Examiner, The Washington Post, and The Washington Times.

In January 2017, Express caused some controversy on the Internet when its cover story on the 2017 Women's March used the male gender symbol instead of the female one. Express apologized for the mistake after its cover went viral, and published an image of the cover with the correct female symbol, which they had intended to run.

In June 2018, Express brought back its DC Rider column, which included features about the Washington Metro and answers reader questions about the Metro transit system. The column is written by Kery Murakami.

Layout and mobile applications
The newspaper launched a redesign on November 30, 2009, which emphasized a more magazine-style front page, along with a daily cover story. On August 4, 2014, it launched another redesign meant to engage readers more with the paper version rather than on a phone. The paper has doubled in size since its launch, from 24–28 pages in 2003 to 48–60 pages in 2012.

The Express staff also produced a website, ExpressNightOut.com, that features local entertainment and lifestyle coverage.

Content from Express could also be viewed on Washington Post Social Reader, a Facebook-linked website that aggregates content from the various publications owned by the Washington Post Company and partner organizations: The Washington Post, Foreign Policy, The Root, Express, Slate, and 90 others.

In August 2010, the newspaper launched a mobile application, DC Rider, which is available for iOS (iPhone and iPod Touch) and Android devices. The ad-supported app provides status updates for the Washington Metro.

See also 

 List of newspapers in Washington, D.C.
 List of free daily newspapers

References

External links

 Official Home Page of the Express.

2003 establishments in Washington, D.C.
Defunct free daily newspapers
Newspapers published in Washington, D.C.
Publications established in 2003
The Washington Post
Defunct newspapers published in Washington, D.C.
2019 disestablishments in Washington, D.C.
Publications disestablished in 2019